Alfred Peck Edgerton (January 11, 1813 – May 14, 1897) was an American businessman who served as a member of the United States House of Representatives from Ohio for two terms from 1851 to 1855.

Early life and career 
Edgerton was born in Plattsburgh, New York, on January 11, 1813. He graduated from Plattsburgh Academy and worked briefly for a newspaper.

He moved to New York City to work in advertising and other business pursuits. Within a few years, in 1837, Edgerton moved to Hicksville, Ohio, an area of development. He became manager of the American Land Company, engaging in surveying and selling land for settlement and development in northern Ohio. He was the founder of Edgerton, Ohio.

Congress
A Democrat, Edgerton served in the Ohio State Senate from 1845 and 1846. He was elected to the United States House of Representatives in 1850 and served two terms as a member of the Thirty-second and Thirty-third Congresses, March 4, 1851, to March 3, 1855.

Later career
After leaving Congress, Edgerton resided in New York City. He worked as the financial agent of Ohio's Board of Fund Commissioners, the agency responsible for issuing, paying interest on, redeeming and canceling the state's general obligation bonds. In 1857 he moved to Fort Wayne, Indiana, as general manager of the Wabash and Erie Canal.

Edgerton returned to Ohio in 1868, and that year was an unsuccessful candidate for lieutenant governor.

In 1873 he built St. Paul's Episcopal Church (Hicksville, Ohio). The church was consecrated on Oct 1, 1875, and on the same day his grandson Robert Swartwout was the first child baptized.

In 1885 Edgerton was appointed Chairman of the United States Civil Service Commission, and he served until 1889.

Death and family legacy
Edgerton died in Hicksville, Ohio, on May 14, 1897. His body was transported to Fort Wayne, Indiana, where he was buried in Lindenwood Cemetery, as was his brother.

Alfred P. Edgerton was the brother of Joseph Ketchum Edgerton, an attorney and businessman who served in Congress from Indiana. His parents were Bela Edgerton and Phebe Ketchum. On February 9, 1841, he married Charlotte Elizabeth Dixon (1816-1895), daughter of Charles Dixon and Lucy Sage. They had eight children, Henry, Cornelia, Frances, Alfred Jr., Charlotte Anna, Arthur, and Dixon Edgerton. He was the grandfather to architect Egerton Swartwout.

Links

References

1813 births
1897 deaths
Politicians from Plattsburgh, New York
People from Hicksville, Ohio
Politicians from Fort Wayne, Indiana
Democratic Party Ohio state senators
Democratic Party members of the United States House of Representatives from Ohio
19th-century American politicians